The statue of Saint Ludmila is an outdoor sculpture by Matthias Braun, installed on the south side of the Charles Bridge in Prague, Czech Republic.

External links

 

Christian sculptures
Monuments and memorials in Prague
Sculptures of women in Prague
Statues on the Charles Bridge